Allan Rodriguez may refer to:

Allan Rodriguez (soccer), an American soccer player
Allan Rodríguez, a Guatemalan politician